Eighth Avenue is a major north–south avenue on the west side of Manhattan in New York City, carrying northbound traffic below 59th Street.  It is one of the original avenues of the Commissioners' Plan of 1811 to run the length of Manhattan, though today the name changes twice.  At 59th Street/Columbus Circle it becomes Central Park West, where it forms the western boundary of Central Park.  North of 110th Street/Frederick Douglass Circle it is known as Frederick Douglass Boulevard before merging onto Harlem River Drive north of 155th Street.

Description

Eighth Avenue begins in the West Village neighborhood at Abingdon Square (where Hudson Street becomes Eighth Avenue at an intersection with Bleecker Street) and runs north for 44 blocks through Chelsea, the Garment District, Hell's Kitchen's east end, Midtown and the Broadway theater district in the eponymous neighborhood, before it finally enters Columbus Circle at 59th Street and becomes Central Park West. North of Frederick Douglass Circle, it resumes its Eighth Avenue designation, but is also known as Frederick Douglass Boulevard. The avenue ends north of 155th Street, and merges into the Harlem River Drive.

MTA Regional Bus Operations primarily operates two bus routes on the avenue. The northbound  serves Eighth Avenue between Abingdon Square and Columbus Circle, while the  serves the length of Eighth Avenue north of 59th Street in its entirety.

Southernmost section 
The southernmost section is known solely as Eighth Avenue between Abingdon Square and Columbus Circle. This portion of Eighth Avenue has carried traffic one-way northbound since June 6, 1954.

Since the 1990s, the stretch of Eighth Avenue that runs through Greenwich Village and its adjacent Chelsea neighborhood has been a center of the city's gay community, with bars and restaurants catering to gay men. New York City's annual gay pride parade takes place along the Greenwich Village section of Eighth Avenue. Also, along with Times Square, the portion of Eighth Avenue from 42nd Street to 50th Street was an informal red-light district in the late 1960s, 1970s, and 1980s before it was controversially renovated into a more family friendly environment under the first mayoral administration of Rudolph Giuliani.

Central Park West

North of Columbus Circle, the roadway becomes Central Park West (abbreviated to CPW). Unlike many Manhattan avenues, CPW has traffic running in two directions, and its address numbering system is different from that of the rest of Eighth Avenue. As its name indicates, CPW forms the western edge of Central Park. It also forms the eastern boundary of the Upper West Side. It runs 51 blocks from Columbus Circle (at 59th Street, or Central Park South) to Frederick Douglass Circle (at 110th Street, or Cathedral Parkway). The gates into Central Park along its western edge are: Merchants Gate at 59th Street, Women's Gate at 72nd, Naturalists Gate at 77th, Hunters Gate at 81st, Mariners Gate at 85th, Gate of All Saints at 96th, Boys Gate at 100th, and Strangers Gate at 106th. Central Park West's expensive housing rivals that of Fifth Avenue on the Upper East Side.

Several famous residences are located on Central Park West, including:
 The Dakota, where John Lennon lived with current resident Yoko Ono, and outside of which he was murdered in 1980
 The San Remo, home to Demi Moore, Diane Keaton, Steve Martin, and U2's Bono
 The El Dorado
 The Beresford, home to Jerry Seinfeld and Diana Ross
 The Langham
 The Century
 15 Central Park West, home to Sting, Alex Rodriguez and Ekaterina Rybolovleva
 41 Central Park West, home to Madonna
 455 Central Park West
 The St. Urban
 The Majestic, home to some of the former heads of the Genovese crime family, including Meyer Lansky, Lucky Luciano and Frank Costello. In 1957, Vincent "The Chin" Gigante shot Frank Costello in the lobby of The Majestic in a failed assassination attempt

According to The New York Timess architecture critic Paul Goldberger, the street's buildings, both the new ones like 15 Central Park West and the old ones such as The Century, "fit together the same way the ones in that hypothetical Main Street do, and for the same reason.  For more than a hundred years, their architects honor the unspoken agreement to work together, to line their buildings up with each other and to work in a consistent scale with materials that are compatible."

Most of these housing cooperatives were built around 1930, replacing late-19th century hotels with the same names.  Some, including The Century, The San Remo, and The Majestic, are twin towers. Other landmarks and institutions along its length include the New-York Historical Society and the American Museum of Natural History. The area from 61st to 97th Streets is included in the Central Park West Historic District.

The building located at 55 Central Park West is the infamous "Spook Central" from the movie Ghostbusters. The famed New York City restaurant Tavern on the Green is located off Central Park West, at 66th Street, within the grounds of Central Park.

In 1899, while exiting a streetcar, Henry Bliss was run over by a taxi at CPW and West 74th Street, becoming the first person to be run down and killed by a motor car in the Americas.

Frederick Douglass Boulevard
North of Frederick Douglass Circle at 110th Street in Harlem, it is Frederick Douglass Boulevard, though sometimes still unofficially referred to as Eighth Avenue. Frederick Douglass Boulevard eventually terminates near the Harlem River at the Harlem River Drive around West 159th Street. While Central Park West has its own address system, address numbers on Frederick Douglass Boulevard continue from where they would be if Central Park West used the Eighth Avenue numbering system.

The corridor along Frederick Douglass Boulevard was reallocated in 2003, allowing for larger residential buildings of greater density, and resulting in the construction of condominiums, rental buildings, restaurants, and cafes. Formerly described as having urban blight, it is now gentrified, especially in the restaurants along its route, giving it the nickname "Restaurant Row". This gentrification is partly due to massive city investment. According to The New York Times the demographic too has changed:

Points of interest
The Fashion Institute of Technology (at 26th/27th Streets)
Madison Square Garden and Penn Station (between 31st and 33rd Streets)
James Farley Post Office
The New York Times Building at 40th Street
The Port Authority Bus Terminal (between 40th and 42nd Streets)
One Worldwide Plaza
Hearst Tower
Soros Foundation and Open Society Institute headquarters on West 59th Street
111 Eighth Avenue, the Art Deco former Inland Freight Terminal of the Port Authority, is the eighth-largest commercial structure in Manhattan, hosting the East Coast headquarters of Google.

Gallery

References
Notes

External links

New York Songlines: Eighth Avenue, a virtual walking tour

 
08
West Village
Greenwich Village
Chelsea, Manhattan
Upper West Side
Harlem
Hell's Kitchen, Manhattan
Midtown Manhattan